Thiruvalar Panjangam is a 2020 Indian Tamil-language comedy film directed by Malarvizhi Natesan and starring Ananth Nag, Kadhal Sukumar, and Gautham.

Plot 
The film is about a man who always listens to his guru until one day he uses astrology to help his friend who is tangled in a murder case. The film takes place over seven days.

Cast 
Ananth Nag as Karthik
Kadhal Sukumar as Karthik's friend
Gautham
Sudha
Aadukalam Naren as a cop
Urvashi
CM Bala

Production 
Newcomer Gautham plays the antagonist. The film has a similar premise to Dhanusu Raasi Neyargale (2019). The film was shot in Chennai.

Release and reception 
The film was scheduled to release on 27 November.

A critic from The Times of India gave the film a rating of one-and-a-half out of five stars and opined that "With an aimless screenplay, unnecessary songs, weak humour, ineffective twists and strictly okayish performances from the two lead characters, Thiruvalar Panchankam becomes a tedious affair". A critic from Maalaimalar called the film a "good attempt" and praised the storyline.

References

External links 

2020 films
2020 comedy films
2020s Tamil-language films
Films about astrology